Gordon Stewart Wood (born November 27, 1933) is an American historian and professor at Brown University. He is a recipient of the 1993 Pulitzer Prize for History for The Radicalism of the American Revolution (1992). His book The Creation of the American Republic, 1776–1787 (1969) won a 1970 Bancroft Prize. In 2010, he was awarded the National Humanities Medal.

Early life and education
Wood was born in Concord, Massachusetts, and grew up in Worcester and Waltham. He graduated summa cum laude and Phi Beta Kappa from Tufts University in 1955 and has served as a trustee there. After serving in the United States Air Force in Japan, during which time he earned an AM at Harvard University, he entered the PhD program in history at Harvard, where he studied under Bernard Bailyn, receiving his PhD in 1964.

Career
Wood has taught at Harvard University, the College of William and Mary, the University of Michigan, Brown University, and in 1982–83 was Pitt Professor at Cambridge University.

In addition to his books (listed below), Wood has written numerous influential articles, notably "Rhetoric and Reality in the American Revolution" (1966), "Conspiracy and the Paranoid Style: Causality and Deceit in the Eighteenth Century" (1982), and "Interests and Disinterestedness in the Making of the Constitution" (1987). He is a frequent contributor to The New York Review of Books and The New Republic.

A recent project was the third volume of the Oxford History of the United States – Empire of Liberty: A History of the Early Republic, 1789–1815 (2009) – a finalist for the Pulitzer Prize.

Contributing to the anthology Our American Story (2019), Wood addressed the possibility of a shared American narrative. He focused on the idea of equality as "the most radical and most powerful ideological force" that the American Revolution unleashed. "This powerful sense of equality is still alive and well in America, and despite all of its disturbing and unsettling consequences, it is what makes us one people."
Wood was elected as a member of the American Academy of Arts and Sciences in 1988 and the American Philosophical Society in 1994.

In popular culture
Speaker of the House Newt Gingrich publicly and effusively praised Wood's The Radicalism of the American Revolution (1992).  Wood, who met Gingrich once in 1994, surmised that Gingrich may have approved because the book "had a kind of Toquevillian touch to it, I guess, maybe suggesting American exceptionalism, that he liked".  He jokingly described Gingrich's praise in an interview on C-SPAN in 2002 as "the kiss of death for me among a lot of academics, who are not right-wing Republicans."

Wood was mentioned in the 1997 film Good Will Hunting. In one scene, Matt Damon's character mentions Gordon Wood while standing up to a Harvard student who is ridiculing Ben Affleck's character at a bar. He accuses the Harvard student of shallowly reiterating ideas he has encountered in his coursework, telling him that soon he would be "regurgitating Gordon Wood, talking about [...] the pre-Revolutionary utopia and the capital-forming effects of military mobilization." Wood said of the scene, "That’s my two seconds of fame! More kids know about that than any of the books I have written." This scene was later parodied by the television show It's Always Sunny in Philadelphia, in which the character Charlie Kelly attempts to "pull a Good Will Hunting" and asks "does no one know who Gordon Wood is?"

Personal life
Wood married the former Louise Goss on April 30, 1956. They have three children: Christopher, Elizabeth and Amy. Their son, Christopher Wood, is a professor of German at New York University and their daughter, Amy, is a professor of history at Illinois State University, and Elizabeth is an administrator at Milton Academy.

Works

Books 
 The Creation of the American Republic, 1776–1787. Chapel Hill, North Carolina: University of North Carolina Press, 1969.
 The Radicalism of the American Revolution. New York: Alfred A. Knopf, 1992.
 The American Revolution: A History. New York: Modern Library, 2001.
 The Americanization of Benjamin Franklin. New York: Penguin Press, 2004.
 Revolutionary Characters: What Made the Founders Different. New York: Penguin Press, 2006.
 The Purpose of the Past: Reflections on the Uses of History. New York: Penguin Press, 2008.
 Empire of Liberty: A History of the Early Republic, 1789–1815. New York: Oxford University Press, 2010.
 The Idea of America: Reflections on the Birth of the United States. New York: Penguin, 2011.
Friends Divided: John Adams and Thomas Jefferson. New York: Penguin, 2017.
 Power and Liberty: Constitutionalism in the American Revolution. New York: Oxford University Press, 2021.

Pamphlets and lectures
 Revolution and the Political Integration of the Enslaved and Disenfranchised. Washington, DC: American Enterprise Institute, 1974.
 The Making of the Constitution. Waco, Texas: Baylor University Press, 1987.
 Monarchism and Republicanism in the Early United States. (Melbourne, Australia: La Trobe University, 2000.

Co-Author
 (With J.R. Pole) Social Radicalism and the Idea of Equality in the American Revolution. Houston, Texas: University of St. Thomas, 1976.
 (With others) The Great Republic. Boston: Little, Brown, 1977; 4th ed.: Lexington, Massachusetts: Heath, 1992.

Book chapters

 (Contributor) Leadership in the American Revolution. Washington, DC: Library of Congress, 1974.
 Sally Hemings and Thomas Jefferson: History, Memory, and Civic Culture. Peter Onuf and Jan Lewis (eds.), Charlottesville, Virginia: University of Virginia Press, 1999.
 To the Best of My Ability: The American Presidency. James M. McPherson (ed.). New York: Society of American Historians, 2000.
 Our American Story. Joshua Claybourn (ed.), Lincoln, Nebraska: Potomac Books, 2019.

As editor

 Representation in the American Revolution. Charlottesville, Virginia: University of Virginia Press, 1969.
 The Rising Glory of America, 1760–1820. New York: George Braziller, 1971. Rev. ed.: Boston: Northeastern University Press, 1990.
 The Confederation and the Constitution. Boston: Little, Brown, 1973.
 With Louise G. Wood. Russian-American Dialogue on the American Revolution. Columbia, Missouri: University of Missouri Press, 1995.
 With Paul A. Gilje et al. Wages of Independence: Capitalism in the Early American Republic. Rowman & Littlefield, 1997.
 With Anthony Molho. Imagined Histories: American Historians Interpret the Past. Princeton, New Jersey: Princeton University Press, 1998.
 John Adams: Revolutionary Writings 1755–1783 (2 vols.). New York: The Library of America, 2011.
 The American Revolution: Writings from the Pamphlet Debate 1764–1776 (2 vols.). New York: The Library of America, 2015.
 John Adams: Writings from the New Nation 1784–1826. New York: The Library of America, 2016.

References

External links
 "Gordon S. Wood", Faculty Webpage, Brown University
 Gordon S. Wood, "The Learning of Liberty for Civic Life", lectures at Boston University
 
 
 
 Booknotes interview with Wood on The American Revolution: A History, April 21, 2002.
 C-SPAN Q&A interview with Wood, April 13, 2008
 In Depth interview with Wood, September 5, 2010

1933 births
21st-century American historians
21st-century American male writers
Brown University faculty
Harvard Graduate School of Arts and Sciences alumni
Harvard University faculty
Historians of the American Revolution
Historians of the United States
Living people
National Humanities Medal recipients
People from Concord, Massachusetts
Bancroft Prize winners
Pulitzer Prize for History winners
College of William & Mary faculty
Tufts University alumni
University of Michigan faculty
Academics of the University of Cambridge
Center for Advanced Study in the Behavioral Sciences fellows
Historians from Massachusetts
American male non-fiction writers
Members of the American Philosophical Society